Peter Schorning (born 16 July 1947) is a German former swimmer. He competed in two events at the 1968 Summer Olympics.

References

1947 births
Living people
German male swimmers
Olympic swimmers of West Germany
Swimmers at the 1968 Summer Olympics
Sportspeople from Essen